Rara is a village development committee (VDC) in Mugu District in the Karnali Zone of north-western Nepal. At the time of the 1991 Nepal census, it had a population of 930, living in 199 individual households.

Rara Lake lies in the eastern part of the VDC.

References

External links
UN map of the municipalities of Mugu District

Populated places in Mugu District